Mordellistena dimidiata is a beetle in the genus Mordellistena of the family Mordellidae. It was described in 1864 by Helmuth.

References

dimidiata
Beetles described in 1864